Clipston may refer to the following places in the United Kingdom:
Clipston, Northamptonshire
Clipston, Nottinghamshire

See also
Clipstone